Greg Rusedski was the defending champion of the singles event of the Heineken Open tennis tournament, held in Auckland, New Zealand, but did not compete that year.

Fourth-seeded Gustavo Kuerten won in the final 6–3, 7–5 against unseeded Dominik Hrbatý.

Seeds
A champion seed is indicated in bold text while text in italics indicates the round in which that seed was eliminated.

  Jiří Novák (quarterfinals)
  David Nalbandian (first round)
  Fernando González (second round)
  Gustavo Kuerten (champion)
  José Acasuso (first round)
  Jan-Michael Gambill (second round)
  Guillermo Coria (quarterfinals)
  Davide Sanguinetti (first round)

Draw

References

External links
 ITF tournament edition details
 Singles draw
 Qualifying Singles draw

2003 Heineken Open
Singles